The Omnium Handicap  was an American Thoroughbred horse race run annually at Sheepshead Bay Race Track in Sheepshead Bay, Brooklyn, New York from 1885 thru 1909. A race for horses of either sex age three and older, it was run on dirt over a distance of a mile and one-eighth. The Omnium was the third and last of the track's autumn serials, coming after the Fall Handicap at 6½ furlongs and the Ocean Handicap at one mile.

Historical notes
New to racing in New York, a relatively unknown western-based horse named Joquita won the inaugural running. Lightly regarded by the betting public, Joquita was sent off at odds of 20–1. However, once those odds were telegraphed across the country, a group of western people each quietly put down what the Daily Racing Form called an "enormous sum of money" with bookmakers. The Joquita "killing" would be talked about for years to come.

The final running of the Omnium was won by King James, owned and trained by future U.S. Racing Hall of Fame inductee Sam Hildreth. King James's performance for the year would earn him recognition as the American Champion Handicap Horse of 1909.

New track records
In 1903 His Eminence, winner of the 1901 Kentucky Derby, set a new Sheepshead Bay track record as did Firestone in winning the 1908 Omnium Handicap.

Demise of the Omnium Handicap 
After years of uncertainty, on June 11, 1908, the Republican controlled New York Legislature under Governor Charles Evans Hughes passed the Hart–Agnew anti-betting legislation with penalties allowing for fines and up to a year in prison. The owners of Sheepshead Bay Race Track, and other racing facilities in New York State, struggled to stay in business without income from betting. Racetrack operators had no choice but to drastically reduce the purse money being paid out which resulted in the Omnium Handicap offering a purse in 1909 that was one-third of what it had been in earlier years. These small purses made horse racing highly unprofitable and impossible for even the most successful horse owners to continue in business. As such, for the 1910 racing season management of the Sheepshead Bay facility dropped some of its less important stakes races and used the purse money to bolster its most important events. The effect was to place the Omnium Handicap on hiatus. Further restrictive legislation was passed by the New York Legislature in 1910 which deepened the financial crisis for track operators and after a 1911 amendment to the law to limit the liability of owners and directors was defeated every racetrack in New York State shut down. Owners, whose horses of racing age had nowhere to go, began sending them, their trainers and their jockeys to race in England and France. Many horses ended their racing careers there, and a number remained to become an important part of the European horse breeding industry. Thoroughbred Times reported that  more than 1,500 American horses were sent overseas between 1908 and 1913 and of them at least 24 were either past, present, or future Champions. When a February 21, 1913 ruling by the New York Supreme Court, Appellate Division Court saw horse racing return in 1913 it was too late for the Sheepshead Bay horse racing facility and it never reopened.

Records
Speed record:
 1:51 2/5  Firestone (1908)  NTR

Most wins:
 2 – Proper (1905, 1906)

Most wins by a jockey:
 2 – Willie Simms (1895, 1897)
 2 – Willie Shaw (1899, 1902)

Winners

References

Discontinued horse races in New York City
Open mile category horse races
Recurring sporting events established in 1885
Recurring sporting events disestablished in 1909
Sheepshead Bay Race Track
1885 establishments in New York (state)
1909 disestablishments in New York (state)